The Copa do Brasil Sub-17 is a Brazilian football competition run by the Brazilian Football Confederation for under–17 teams. The first edition was played from July 2013 to August of the same year.

Finals

Winners and runners-up

References 

Youth football competitions in Brazil
Football cup competitions in Brazil
Under-17 association football‎